NGC 193 is a lenticular galaxy located in the constellation Pisces. It was discovered on December 21, 1786 by William Herschel.

References

External links
 

0193
0408
+00-02-103
Pisces (constellation)
Lenticular galaxies
002359